Lauri Saag (born 26 May 1977) is an Estonian mycologist and lichenologist.

He has described the following taxon: 
 Lepraria caesioalba var. groenlandica L.Saag, 2007

References

1977 births
Estonian mycologists
Living people
Place of birth missing (living people)
University of Tartu alumni
Academic staff of the University of Tartu
21st-century Estonian scientists